Innocence + Experience: Live in Paris (stylised as iNNOCENCE + eXPERIENCE: Live in Paris) is a 2016 concert film by Irish rock band U2. It was shot on 7 December 2015 at AccorHotels Arena in Paris, France, on the final date of the band's Innocence + Experience Tour. The concert aired on American television network HBO the same day as the show, and was later released worldwide on home video on DVD, Blu-ray, and via digital download on 10 June 2016. 

The video depicts U2's return to Paris less than a month after the 13 November 2015 attacks in the city. The band had played two of four scheduled shows in the city when the attacks occurred, forcing the postponement of the final two shows and the originally planned HBO broadcast until December. During the filmed concert, U2 paid tribute to the victims of the attacks and were joined on-stage by Eagles of Death Metal, whose concert at the Bataclan was the site of the deadliest of the attacks.

Background
Innocence + Experience: Live in Paris was originally scheduled to air on American television network HBO on 14 November 2015 to showcase a performance by U2 on their Innocence + Experience Tour at AccorHotels Arena in Paris, France from earlier that day. However, the broadcast was rescheduled after the terrorist attacks in Paris the day prior forced the postponement of the band's final two Paris concerts, which were scheduled for 14 and 15 November. The shows were rescheduled to 6 and 7 December, making them the final dates of the European leg of the tour. According to tour producer Arthur Fogel, "minimal" refunds were requested (3,000 of the 34,000 tickets sold). The rescheduling posed logistical challenges for the band, as the tour was supposed to end in Dublin more than a week prior to the new Paris dates, and crew members and equipment had been set to disperse. Arena security was bolstered for the rescheduled shows. Writing about U2's plan to return to a Paris still on high alert, Don Kaplan of the New York Daily News said, "The Dublin band, born in the crucible of violence that gripped Ireland in the 1970s and '80s, has long collaborated with other musicians, artists, celebrities, and politicians to address issues concerning poverty, disease, and social injustice. That they've now opted to challenge terrorism and fear should surprise absolutely no one."

Concert overview and production

U2 paid tribute to the victims of the attacks by displaying their names on the video screen during their performance of "City of Blinding Lights". The display was created by Willie Williams and the tour's video team. Guitarist the Edge said the group tried to balance paying tribute "in an artful way that doesn't feel exploitive or jingoistic or anything trite".  At the end of the show, the group were joined on-stage by Eagles of Death Metal, who were returning to the city for the first time since their show at the Bataclan where the deadliest of the attacks in Paris occurred, killing 89 people. Bono introduced the group by saying, "They were robbed of their stage, so we would like to offer them ours." The two bands performed a cover of Patti Smith's song "People Have the Power" before U2 left the stage and Eagles of Death Metal concluded the show with their song "I Love You All the Time". The Edge singled out the moment in which the members of U2 handed their instruments to Eagles of Death Metal as his favourite of the evening.

Audio aspects of the television broadcast were handled by Music Mix Mobile (M3). The company's co-founder John Harris served as co-mixer, alongside the band's own mixer Carl Glanville, who worked on the Songs of Innocence album and the tour pre-production. Leading up to the concert, Harris travelled on tour with U2 for two months and recorded 20 shows in six countries to familiarise himself with their setlist. For the Paris concert, he chose several digital audio processing solutions by Waves Audio, including Waves MultiRack, H-Reverb Hybrid Reverb, CLA-76 Compressor/Limiter, and L360 Surround Limiter. Harris said that the arena was "not acoustically perfect" and that his responsibility was "to create an acoustic space [for the broadcast] that compensates for that". Most of the reverb heard on the broadcast was achieved using the H-Reverb product. For the show, 126 audio inputs were recorded, including 12 bass channels and those covering three separate drum sets. Harris used a Waves workstation in an M3 Eclipse truck, duplicating the workstation that he used daily in the United States.

Release
The concert was released on DVD, Blu-ray, and via digital download on 10 June 2016. Deluxe editions of physical copies include bonus video material. A super deluxe bundle includes: a USB light bulb; a 64-page hardcover book; stencil set; dog tags; badges; and a downloadable copy of the concert.

The packaging for the home release was designed by AMP Visual in conjunction with long-time band consultant Gavin Friday. The cover image depicts a lightbulb, which was used as a prop at the beginning of shows on the Innocence + Experience Tour to represent U2's early, innocent days. The light bulb on the cover was taken from a desk lamp, photographed, and given a "tough punk-like graphic" treatment. The packaging design is an homage to Andy Warhol's artwork for The Velvet Underground & Nico; additionally, the two-DVD edition of Innocence + Experience: Live in Paris features a peel-off sticker of the light bulb, similar to the banana sticker that peels off the cover of The Velvet Underground & Nico.

On 15 March 2021, U2 announced a concert broadcast series called "The Virtual Road" in partnership with YouTube, by which four of the group's past concert films were remastered and streamed on the band's official YouTube channel for 48 hours each. Innocence + Experience: Live in Paris began streaming on 10 April, with a pre-recorded performance by French rock band Feu! Chatterton serving as an "opening act". To coincide with the broadcast event, a four-track EP of songs from Innocence + Experience was released to streaming services and digital stores.

Reception

Television ratings
The Monday night broadcast of the concert on HBO drew 140,000 viewers and a 0.06 rating in the 18–49 age demographic, according to Nielsen data.

Critical reaction

Jeff Miers of The Buffalo News gave the concert a favourable review, saying that the band mostly "rose to the occasion through the course of a two-hour show filled with songs and statements that seemed eerily prescient." Miers thought the Songs of Innocence tracks were weaker compared to the group's other songs, but overall praised the concert: "During its many majestic moments, the band's show suggested that the spirit that infuses the best rock music – one of defiant optimism, compassion and passion, a liberal and open-minded view of the world, and the stubborn belief that a few chords and a little truth can change the world, one consciousness at a time – was not snuffed out when terrorists stormed the Bataclan."

Reviewing the home video release, Mike Mettler of Sound & Vision said, "U2's live-stage mastery is on generous full display here, directed with a keen, all-encompassing eye by longtime band video associate Hamish Hamilton". He concluded, "the elegiac envelopment of the sounds and visuals of iNNOCENCE + eXPERIENCE is something to behold on Blu-ray on any given beautiful day, so don't let it slip away."

In January 2017, the Digital Entertainment Group honoured Innocence + Experience with an award for "Best Concert Video on Blu-Ray".

Track listing
Track list per U2.com official website.

Personnel
Bono – lead vocals
The Edge – guitar, piano, vocals
Adam Clayton – bass guitar
Larry Mullen Jr. – drums, backing vocals, percussion

Charts

Weekly charts

Year-end charts

Certifications

References

Concert films
U2 video albums
2016 films
2016 video albums
U2 live albums
Films directed by Hamish Hamilton (director)
2015 television specials
HBO network specials